Bruno Versavel (born 27 August 1967) is a Belgian former professional footballer who played as a midfielder, most notably for KV Mechelen and R.S.C. Anderlecht.

Playing career
Born in Diest, Versavel made his debut in professional football at KFC Diest before moving to KSC Lokeren. While at KV Mechelen he won the Belgian League and the European Super Cup. He then moved to R.S.C. Anderlecht where he played five seasons. He also played for Serie B side AC Perugia and Swiss club FC Lugano before moving back to Belgium to play for FC Herentals, K.F.C. Verbroedering Geel and K.V. Turnhout. Versavel earned 28 caps for the Belgium national team scoring four times.

Coaching career
After retiring in 2012, he became manager of KSV Oud-Turnhout. Versavel left the club in the summer 2015 because had an oral agreement with KVK Beringen. However, KVK Beringen did not keep their word and chose another coach.

Versavel was then without club until 24 January 2017 where it was announced, that he had become the new manager of KFCMD Halen. On 5 March 2018, he became the manager of KOVC Sterrebeek. He was fired four months later.

In February 2019 it was confirmed, that Versavel would take charge of KESK Leopoldsburg from the upcoming 2019–20 season. But already in October 2019 it was decided by mutual consultation, to end the cooperation.

Career statistics

International goals
Scores and results list Belgium's goal tally first, score column indicates score after each Versavel goal.

Honours

Player 
KV Mechelen
 Belgian First Division: 1988–89
 European Super Cup: 1988
 Amsterdam Tournament: 1989
 Joan Gamper Trophy: 1989
 Jules Pappaert Cup: 1990

Anderlecht
 Belgian First Division: 1992–93, 1993–94, 1994–95
 Belgian Cup: 1993–94; runner-up 1996–97
 Belgian Super Cup: 1993, 1995

References

External links
 
 

1967 births
Living people
Belgian footballers
Association football midfielders
Belgium international footballers
1990 FIFA World Cup players
Belgian Pro League players
Serie B players
K.F.C. Diest players
K.S.C. Lokeren Oost-Vlaanderen players
K.V. Mechelen players
R.S.C. Anderlecht players
FC Lugano players
A.C. Perugia Calcio players
Belgian expatriate footballers
Expatriate footballers in Italy
Belgian expatriate sportspeople in Italy
Expatriate footballers in Switzerland
Belgian expatriate sportspeople in Switzerland
People from Diest
Footballers from Flemish Brabant